Kusaiea is a genus of small air-breathing land snails, terrestrial pulmonate gastropod mollusks in the family Euconulidae, the hive snails.

Species 
Species within the genus Kusaiea include:
 Kusaiea frivola

References

 Nomenclator Zoologicus info

 
Euconulidae
Taxonomy articles created by Polbot